Ralph Wiggum is a recurring character on the animated series, The Simpsons. He is voiced by Nancy Cartwright. Ralph, the supposed son of Police Chief Wiggum, is a classmate of Lisa Simpson and is characterized by his frequent non-sequiturs and humorous behavior. His lines range from nonsensical and bizarre interpretations of a current event to profound statements that go over people's heads. His behavior varies between blissfully unaware, dim-witted, awkwardly spontaneous, and even occasionally straightforward. 

The creator of the show, Matt Groening, has cited Ralph as his favorite character. He generally remains one of the more popular and often quoted secondary characters in the show. In 2006, IGN ranked Ralph No. 3 on their list of the "Top 25 Simpsons Peripheral Characters," behind Sideshow Bob and Troy McClure.

Role in The Simpsons
Ralph is a mentally challenged and good-natured 8-year-old boy in Lisa Simpson's second-grade class, taught by Ms. Hoover. For the first  seasons, he was mostly used as a background child character, with very few speaking roles or consistent personality traits. He has since become one of the more prominent secondary characters on the show, even being the focus of, or at least a major character in some episodes.

These episodes include: "I Love Lisa" (season four, 1993), an episode which set him apart from other tertiary characters and defined much of the character, "This Little Wiggy" (season nine, 1998), and "E Pluribus Wiggum" (season nineteen, 2008); as well as appearances both minor and prominent in many other episodes. Ralph also appears in various other media, such as the Simpsons comic book series by Bongo, and has even received his own entry in The Simpsons Library of Wisdom series.

Personality

Ralph's primary role in the show is to deliver tangent and non-sequitur material, usually with cluelessness and odd behavior, often used to perplex, or give the audience a quick laugh. He has a very carefree temperament, as he is often off in his own world. This role has had many variations over the years, and as such, Ralph often displays inconsistent behavior. In some episodes, he is shown as quite stupid, verbally challenged, and slow, such as proclaiming, "I won, I won!" when being told he was failing English, then questioning it and saying, "Me fail English? That's unpossible!", or running on all fours on a hamster wheel. Although it has never been explicitly stated in any Simpsons-related media that Ralph is intellectually disabled and/or brain damaged, it has been hinted in scenes such as a flashback (during the episode "Moms I'd Like to Forget") where Chief Wiggum is holding a baby Ralph, who is drinking out of a bottle. Wiggum suddenly drops the baby Ralph, who lands flat on his head. When Wiggum picks Ralph up again, Ralph suddenly has difficulty drinking out of his bottle. In other episodes, he speaks in a perfectly normal tone, such as in "I Love Lisa" when he gives an uncharacteristically powerful performance as George Washington in a school play. He even occasionally displays a penchant for certain talents. The inconclusive nature of his character seems to be one of his only consistencies, and has even been used as a joke in itself a few times, such as Ralph being poached by the Chicago Tribune. Occasionally, Ralph has even been used to break the fourth wall straightforwardly.

Creation and design
Ralph's first credited appearance in the show was in the episode "Moaning Lisa". He was considerably different in both appearance, and behavior, from his later appearance. Ralph's modern design first appeared in the second-season episode "Homer vs. Lisa and the 8th Commandment", and in a couple of episodes after this, Ralph can be caught speaking with a voice similar to that of Nelson Muntz's, before acquiring the higher-pitched voice that would become permanent afterwards. Originally intended to be a "Mini-Homer," Ralph eventually took on a life of his own. The staff figured that he would also fit perfectly as the son of Chief Wiggum, a fact initially hinted at in "Kamp Krusty" (when Lisa addresses him as "Wiggum") and later made canon in "I Love Lisa". Ralph was named after comedian Jackie Gleason's character on The Honeymooners Ralph Kramden. Matt Groening considers any lines for Ralph "really hard to write." Nancy Cartwright raises her eyebrows whenever she performs Ralph's voice.

Ralph's normal attire usually consists of a blue long-sleeve shirt with a collar, a belt with a red buckle, and brown pants. However, almost all Simpsons-related media and merchandise, including the comic book, often portray Ralph with white or light gray colored pants, instead similar to how Bart is occasionally depicted with a blue shirt instead of his standard orange shirt. Ralph's "stringy" hair is meant to be drawn to make the shape of a bowl-cut and may allude to Eddie (who has similar hair) being his biological father. In one particular issue of the comic book, Ralph appears along with other Springfield residents, drawn in a realistic style, which depicts him with blonde hair, implying that the hairlines are meant to be a silhouette of a blonde bowl-cut. Adult Ralph in "Bart to the Future" also has light brown hair.

Reception
Ralph has become one of the show's most popular characters. He is commonly featured on media and merchandise related to the show, including the season 13 home media box set. Kidrobot released Ralph as a separate figure from the rest of their Simpsons line of figurines in 2009. The figure is twice as large as the other ones. The comedy band The Bloodhound Gang made a song titled "Ralph Wiggum" on the album Hefty Fine, dedicated to the character and composed solely of some of his most famous quotes for lyrics. Show creator Matt Groening has stated that writers will most likely take credit for Ralph when someone asks who writes specific characters, which is a common misconception about the writing process.

References

The Simpsons characters
Television characters introduced in 1989
Child characters in television
Child characters in animated films
Fictional elementary school students
Male characters in animated series
Characters created by Matt Groening
de:Figuren aus Die Simpsons#Ralph Wiggum